A Broad Bellflower is a 1987 North Korean movie directed by People's Artiste Jo Kyong Sun. People's Actor Kim Ryong Jo, Merited Actress O Mi Ran, and Merited Actress Song Yon Ok star as lead roles within this movie. The film was screened at the Melbourne International Film Festival.

Plot
The film stars two orphan sisters, Song Rim (played by O Mi Ran) and Song Hwa, who live together in a rural mountain town. Song Rim aspires to develop their underdeveloped town. However, her lover Won Bong, who lives in the city, does not show much excitement for her plans, leading to their breakup. While Song Rim tries to expand the town she dies in a mudslide caused by a rainstorm. Song Hwa continues the work of her late sister, and the town's development plans end up being successful. Won Bong eventually regrets breaking up with Song Rim, after her success in the endeavor he initially criticized.

Background for production and reception
The film was produced by the Korea February 8 Film Studio. It was made in the context of the 1980s trend of North Korea, which aimed to honor "hidden heroes". Kim Jong-il inspected the demo film himself in 1987. The film tries to provide a solution to the problems of urban-centric developments, which led many young people to go to the city. The film was well-received by critics and audiences alike. Oh Mi-ran won the award for best actress in 1987 Pyongyang International Film Festival.

References

External links

1987 films
1980s Korean-language films
North Korean drama films